Dira oxylus, the Pondoland widow, is a butterfly of the family Nymphalidae. It is found in from the lower Drakensberg foothills from the eastern Cape to KwaZulu-Natal in South Africa.

The wingspan is 50–60 mm for males and 55–65 mm for females. Adults are on wing from late December to early March. There is one generation per year

The larvae feed on various Poaceae species, including Ehrharta erecta.

References

Butterflies described in 1881
Satyrini
Taxa named by Roland Trimen
Butterflies of Africa